Yusef Hamadani Cohen (1916 – 29 March 2014) was the Chief Rabbi of Iran and spiritual leader for the Jewish community of Iran (Iranian Jews) between January 1994 and 2007.

In August 2000, Chief Rabbi Hamadani Cohen met with Iranian President Mohammad Khatami for the first time. In 2003, Cohen and Member of Parliament Morris Motamed met with Khatami at Yusef Abad Synagogue which was the first time a President of Iran had visited a synagogue since the Islamic Revolution. For the event, Cohen led the opening the Torah scroll ark and the reciting of prayers.

Cohen died after a long illness on 29 March 2014 in Tehran over Shabbat.

References

1916 births
2014 deaths
Chief rabbis of Iran
Mizrahi Jews
20th-century rabbis
21st-century rabbis
People from Tehran